Ceratothoa  oestroides is a crustacean isopod, obligate ectoparasite of marine fish that dwells in the buccal cavity. It is the causative agent of various pathologies including tissue damage at the parasitisation site (tongue), growth defects, decrease in mean host weight and size and increases mortalities in farmed and wild fish populations.  It has been recorded in six different fish families: Sparidae (Boops boops, Diplodus annularis, Pagelus erythrinus, Spicara smaris, Sparus aurata), Carangidae (Trachurus mediterraneus), Clupeidae (Sardina pilchardus), Maenidae, Scorpenidae (Scorpaena notata, Scorpaena porcus), and Mugilidae (Liza aurata).

Adult male and female mate in the host buccal cavity (Fig. 1). Embryos develop in the female marsupium, where offspring pass through different pullus stages until they are released from the marsupium as free swimming manca, ready for infecting fish hosts. C. oestroides is one of the most devastating ectoparasites in Mediterranean aquaculture, with an unequal distribution along different geographical areas

Life cycle 

The life cycle of Cymothoidae, which are proteandric hermaphrodites, encompasses mating of adult male and female in the host buccal cavity, development of embryos in the female marsupium followed by moulting through pullus stages (I–IV stages). The first pullus (I stage) can be found only in the marsupium where it moults into second pullus (II stage). Although most Cymothoidae have pullus stages I–IV, only pullus stages I and II seem to exist in Ceratothoa oestroides (Fig. 2).

Sexual differentiation occurs only after young leave the brood pouch. As free swimming manca (infective stage), the parasite will seek and attach to an appropriate host, and will then moult, losing the swimming setae and becoming immotile. The parasite attaches on the host body (flanks, fins), and then crawls towards the operculum, where it enters the buccal cavity and settles on the base of the tongue. After permanent attachment is completed, another moult follows. A seventh segment and pair of pereopods appears, typical for the isopod pre-adult form. An isopod in this pre-adult form will function as male until conditions require it to transform in to female. Sexual transformation is a complex process and depends on many factors. After transformation into female (Figs. 3 and 4), the isopod is known as an adult. Alternatively, individuals that are first to reach the buccal cavity may undergo sexual differentiation (male puberty, mature male, transitory male stage, female puberty, mature female). Females block sexual differentiation of a second individual parasite within a host. This second individual remains in the mature male stage as long as the female is alive. All the life stages of C. oestroides are found on the fish host, if we also include the pulli that are situated in the female pouch.

Pathology and clinical signs 
This parasite causes various pathologies, including tissue damage of the tongue, growth defects, anaemia, decrease in mean host weight and size and increased mortalities in farmed and wild fish populations. It has not been observed to impair feed intake in pre- and harvest-sized fish. Instead, the decrease in fingerlings’ weight is likely attributed to the suspected hematophagous nature of the parasite. Athanassopoulou et al. (1999) noticed that Ceratothoa-infected fish are also infected with Rickettsia-like organisms (RLO), and related the latter pathogen to transmission by the isopod. Apparently, infection of RLO is higher in Ceratothoa-highly infected farms (Vagianou et al. 2006). Vagianou et al. (2006) observed that larval stages of C. oestroides (pulli II) that attack small fish induce the most damage, causing severe ulcers and extensive granulomatous lesions in the eyes that lead to blindness or the total loss of the eyeball. However, this was not reported in other geographic area where the isopod has been found in reared fish. Fish infected with adult parasites did not show serious pathology. Lesions were localized at the upper and lower jaws and the tongue.

Impact 
Growth of farmed fish can be depressed and fish can suffer from post-haemorrhagic anaemia. Growth of market size caged fish infected with the parasite can be reduced by up to 20% compared to market size, uninfected caged fish. For example, parasitised sea bass (Dicentrarchus labrax) in the age group of 291–293 days had reduced growth by 20.1% (14 g) and reduced length of 7.1% (12.63 mm) compared to non-parasitised fish.

Diagnosis 
C. oestroides infection is easily diagnosed by examining the buccal cavity and determining the presence of the parasite.

Treatments 
Treatment of isopod infestations on young fish has been attempted with success by means of hourly formalin baths and manual removing from the buccal cavity during the vaccination for other diseases.

Other control strategies 
Within a fish farm, it is common practice to decrease the number of wild fish population by fish net, as well as periodically clean the floating cages nets, depending on the season. Horton and Okamura (2001) suggest grading of smaller and larger fish and their separation, mooring the cages in deeper sites with sufficient currents to disperse the juvenile parasites in a direction away from the cages. Often, in cases of heavy parasitism and mortality, reducing the fish density is enough to remedy the situation.

References 

Cymothoida
Marine fauna of Europe
Crustaceans of the Atlantic Ocean
Fauna of the Mediterranean Sea
Parasitic crustaceans
Parasites of fish
Fish farming
Crustaceans described in 1826
Taxa named by Antoine Risso